Jonathan Pownall (born 22 August 1991) is an English professional rugby league footballer who plays as a  winger for the Leigh Centurions in the Betfred Championship.

He previously played for the Leigh Centurions and Toronto Wolfpack.

Career
Pownall made his senior début for Leigh on 6 March 2011 in a Challenge Cup match against the amateur club Hull Dockers. His first league game was on 22 May 2011 in a Championship match against Hunslet Hawks.

In 2016, it was announced that Pownall would join Toronto Wolfpack for the 2017 season. He made his début in the 3rd round of the 2017 Challenge Cup.

References

External links

Toronto Wolfpack profile

1991 births
Living people
Barrow Raiders players
Bradford Bulls players
English rugby league players
Leigh Leopards players
Rugby league wingers
Toronto Wolfpack players